Magdalena Smoczyńska, born 25 April 1947 in Kraków, is a Polish psycholinguist and expert in the development of language in children. She is an emeritus reader in the department of linguistics at Jagiellonian University where she was once head of the Child Language Laboratory and now studies specific language impairment (SLI) at the Institute for Educational Research.

Life and work 
While much of her research is about language acquisition in Polish-speaking children, it has cross-linguistic and international significance. She has been a visiting professor at the University at Buffalo and the University of Sheffield, and is a life member of the Linguistic Society of America.

She is the daughter of Anna and Jerzy Turowicz, once editor of Tygodnik Powszechny magazine. She was awarded a Ph.D in 1978 from Jagiellonian University and a Dr. hab. in 1988.

Private life 
Magdalena Turowicz married Wojciech Smoczyński around 1970. Their children are Michał and Maciej (twins  born in 1971) and Wawrzyniec (born 1976).

References 

Women linguists
Developmental psycholinguists
Academic staff of Jagiellonian University
Living people
Polish women academics
University at Buffalo faculty
1947 births